General elections were held in Guatemala on 16 June 2019, to elect the President, Congress and local councils. A second round of the presidential elections was held on 11 August 2019, since no candidate won a majority in the first round. Alejandro Giammattei won the election in the second round of voting.

Incumbent President Jimmy Morales was constitutionally barred from running for a second four-year term.

Electoral system
The President of Guatemala is elected using the two-round system.

The 160 members of Congress are elected by two methods; 130 are elected from 22 multi-member constituencies based on the departments, with the remaining 31 elected from a single nationwide constituency. Seats are elected using closed list Proportional representation, with seats allocated using the D'Hondt method.

Candidates

Thelma Aldana's candidature was rejected by authorities in April 2019 on the grounds of alleged corruption cases concerning her. She denies the accusations and attributes them to what she calls the "pact of the corrupt", composed of politicians and business leaders of the country. As former Attorney General, she had uncovered several major corruption cases. Aldana appealed the ruling, but the appeal was rejected in May 2019.

The candidature of Zury Ríos, daughter of Guatemalan dictator from 1982 to 1983 Efraín Ríos Montt, was rejected by authorities in May 2019 on the grounds that the country's constitution bars close relatives of coup leaders from serving as president.

In April 2019, centre-right candidate Mario Estrada was arrested. He is accused by the American authorities of having made a deal with the Sinaloa cartel - from which he allegedly obtained between 10 and 12 million dollars for his election campaign - and of having ordered the murder of rival candidates.

Declined candidates
Manuel Baldizón: deputy of the Congress 2004-2008, secretary-general of Renewed Democratic Liberty 2010-2014, presidential candidate in 2011 and 2015.
Ernest Steve "Neto" Bran: Mayor of Mixco since 2016.
Jorge Pérez: Secretary of Executive Coordination of the Presidency 2000-2002.
Erik Súñiga: Mayor of Ayutla, San Marcos, 2008-2020.
Nineth Montenegro: Deputy of the Congress by National List since 1996, Second Vice President of the Congress 2012-2013, General Secretary of the Encuentro de Guatemala since 2007.

Opinion polls

First round

Second round

Debates

Results

President

Congress

Central American Parliament

Municipal

Notes

References

External links
Tribunal Supremo Electoral 

Presidential elections in Guatemala
Guatemala
General election
Elections in Guatemala
June 2019 events in North America
Election and referendum articles with incomplete results